The Chamberlain Benjamin House is a historic home at 100 South Market Street at the corner of Clinton Street Johnstown, Fulton County, New York. It was built in 1816 and is a -story, gable-roofed, brick, Federal period residence.  It consists of a three-by-four-bay main block with a long, rectangular 2-story, four-bay rear wing.  The interior is based on a side-hall plan. It features a blind-arcade front with brick pilasters and stepped parapet gable ends.

It was listed on the National Register of Historic Places in 1999.

References

External links

Houses on the National Register of Historic Places in New York (state)
Federal architecture in New York (state)
Houses completed in 1816
Houses in Fulton County, New York
1816 establishments in New York (state)
National Register of Historic Places in Fulton County, New York